Radio Sonder Grense (RSG), i.e. Radio Without Borders, is an Afrikaans-language radio service run by the South African Broadcasting Corporation for the whole of South Africa.  Since Afrikaans is one of South Africa's 11 official languages, the SABC is required to carry an Afrikaans-language service on both radio and television.  RSG is the radio part of this Afrikaans-language service.  RSG broadcasts mostly on FM utilizing transmitters owned and operated by Sentech, the former signal distribution division of the SABC.

RSG was launched as the SABC's "B" service in 1937 - one year after the inception of the Corporation and its "A" service (English) in 1936. It was known as the "Afrikaanse Diens van die SAUK" (Afrikaans Service of the SABC) for many years until the Corporation restructured its entire radio portfolio in 1986 and it became known as "Radio Suid-Afrika". In the early 1990s it changed its name to "Afrikaans Stereo" and then took on its slogan "Radio Sonder Grense" as name after the 1996 SABC Radio restructure during which each one of the language services dropped the name of the actual language out of the station names.

RSG was a publisher of a chart of the best-selling CD albums in South Africa called SA Top 20.

Broadcast time
24/7

Listenership figures

See also 
 Amore Bekker (RSG radio personality).

References

External links

Radio stations in South Africa
Afrikaans-language radio stations
Radio stations established in 1937